The Curious Impertinent (Spanish: El curioso impertinente) is a 1953 Spanish historical film directed by Flavio Calzavara and starring Aurora Bautista, José María Seoane and Roberto Rey. It is based on a noteworthy story from Don Quixote by Miguel de Cervantes, extracted from his famous exemplary novels (novelas ejemplares).

Plot

The film's plot turns around the story between two friends called Lothario (britanized from Lotario) and Anselmo, and the latter's wife, Camila. Anselmo, preyed by an impertinent curiosity, asks Lotario to flirt with Camila, to prove her loyalty.
At first, Camila spurns outraged the pretensions of Lotario, and Anselmo remains content about his wife's loyalty, but then convinces Lotario to keep flirting with her. Lotario and Camila finally become lovers, whereas Anselmo remains content about the loyalty of both his friend and wife, not knowing about the love affair which they maintain in secret.
An unforeseeable circumstance reveals the truth, so Camila ends up running away from the house, and Anselmo dies writing the cause of his mourning.

Cast
 Valeriano Andrés  
 Ricardo B. Arévalo  
 Aurora Bautista 
 Eduardo Fajardo 
 Manuel Kayser  
 Encarna Paso 
 Miguel Pastor 
 Roberto Rey 
 Carlos Rufart 
 José María Seoane 
 Eugenia Vera 
 Rosita Yarza

References

Bibliography 
 Klossner, Michael. The Europe of 1500-1815 on Film and Television: A Worldwide Filmography of Over 2550 Works, 1895 Through 2000. McFarland & Company, 2002.

External links 
 

1950s historical films
Spanish historical films
1953 films
1950s Spanish-language films
Films based on Don Quixote
Films directed by Flavio Calzavara
Spanish black-and-white films
1950s Spanish films